The  was an automated guideway transit (AGT) vehicle used for passenger service on the Port Island Line (Port Liner) of the Kobe New Transit.

8000 series was introduced on February 5, 1981 on the opening of the Port Island Line.

The introduction of the Kobe New Transit 2000 series in 2006 led to the gradual displacement of the 8000 series trains, the last of which was withdrawn on November 8, 2009.

Electric multiple units of Japan
Kobe New Transit
Railway services introduced in 1980
Kawasaki multiple units